Helena Suková and Todd Woodbridge were the defending champions but only Woodbridge competed that year with Jana Novotná.

Novotná and Woodbridge lost in the final 6–2, 6–4 against Elna Reinach and Patrick Galbraith.

Seeds
Champion seeds are indicated in bold text while text in italics indicates the round in which those seeds were eliminated.

Draw

Final

Top half

Bottom half

References
1994 US Open – Doubles draws and results at the International Tennis Federation

Mixed Doubles
US Open (tennis) by year – Mixed doubles